Farkas "Wolfgang" Ferenc Molnár (1897–1945) was a Hungarian architect, painter, essayist, and graphic artist. He is associated with the first generation of Bauhaus movement, and was active in Budapest.

Biography 
Farkas Molnár was born in 1897 in Pécs, southwestern Hungary. He attended Hungarian University of Fine Arts from 1915 to 1917; followed by study at the Budapest University of Technology and Economics in 1917 before he was expelled for his leftist views. 

In 1921, he became a member of Bauhaus University, Weimar and studied under Johannes Itten, and later Walter Gropius. In 1924, he studied under Georg Muche and Marcel Breuer; and worked on designing the exterior and interior of terraced houses. 

He participated in the KUT exhibitions with his paintings and designs, as well as was a founding member of the Hungarian Workshop Association, and took part in the Bauhaus tradition of the Green Donkey Theater's stage workshop. Molnár designed the "U-Theatre", a motorized stage that could glide horizontally. 

In 1929, Gropius invited him to the CIAM Congress (Congres Internationaux d'Architecture Moderne) in Frankfurt. After his return, together with Marcello Breuer and József Fischer, he founded the CIAM branch in Hungary.

His work is part of museum collections including Museum of Modern Art (MoMA), and Stedelijk Museum Amsterdam.

Publications

References 

1897 births
1945 deaths
Hungarian architects
Bauhaus University, Weimar alumni
People from Pécs
Hungarian University of Fine Arts alumni
Budapest University of Technology and Economics alumni
20th-century Hungarian architects
Modernist architects